Thompson v. Washington, 434 U.S. 898 (1977), was a case dismissed by the Supreme Court of the United States for lack of federal question jurisdiction.

Background 
The case was on appeal from the Supreme Court of Washington, and it involved a second degree murder conviction based on the felony murder rule.

Subsequent developments 
Thompson v. Washington was cited in the later Washington case State v. Wanrow, 91 Wash.2d 301 (1978), as an endorsement of the constitutionality of the felony murder rule.

References 

United States Supreme Court cases
1977 in United States case law
United States Supreme Court cases of the Burger Court